Marichyasana (IAST: Maricyāsana, the pose of the sage Marichi) is a sitting twist asana in modern yoga as exercise, in some forms combined with a forward bend.

Etymology and origins

The name of the pose is from Sanskrit मरीचि Marichi, the name of a sage in Hindu mythology, and आसन, āsana, meaning posture or seat.

The pose is not found in medieval hatha yoga texts, but is described in Krishnamacharya's 1934 Yoga Makaranda and in the teaching of his pupils, B. K. S. Iyengar and Pattabhi Jois.

Description 

This twisting asana is normally performed sitting. In Marichyasana I, one leg is stretched out straight ahead of the body, the other is bent with the sole of the foot on the floor and the knee up beside the body. The body is twisted towards the side with the straight leg, and the arms are clasped behind the back and around the raised knee. The body may then lean forwards until the nose and chin touch the straight leg.

Variations 

In Marichyasana II, the leg on the ground is folded as for padmasana (lotus), while the other leg is bent as in Marichyasana I; the body is twisted towards the leg on the ground, and the arms are clasped behind the back and around the raised knee. The body may then be leant forwards until the chin touches the knee that is resting on the ground.

In Marichyasana III, the leg on the ground is stretched out straight. The body is twisted towards the side with the bent leg, and again the arms are clasped behind the back and around the raised knee.

Marichyasana IV puts together the movements of Marichyasana II and III. The leg on the ground is folded as for padmasana; the body is twisted towards the raised knee.

This asana may also be performed standing, the foot of the bent leg resting on the seat of a chair and the body turned across the bent leg to face a wall.

Benefits 

Standing Marichyasana is stated to be helpful in relieving backache.

See also 

 Bharadvajasana, a seated twist with both knees on the floor
 Jathara Parivartanasana, a reclining twist with both knees to one side
 Matsyendrasana, a seated twist with one knee up

References

Sources 

 
 

Sitting asanas
Twisting asanas
Hip-opening asanas
Asymmetric asanas